Cauchas dietziella is a moth of the family Adelidae or fairy longhorn moths. It was described by William D. Kearfott in 1908. It is found in North America, including Alabama and Massachusetts.

References

Adelidae
Moths described in 1908
Moths of North America